The 2,500-ton steamship Woodville was built in 1892 for Woodville SS Co Ltd (Balls & Stansfield) of North Shields, England. She was then sold during World War I to the Southern Whaling and Sealing Company, Liverpool.

She was one of three ships bought by the African and Eastern Trade Corporation in 1924. She was sold to Greek owners BJ Andreadakis & A Stavridis, (Piraeus) in 1927, shortly before African and Eastern merged with the Royal Niger Company to form United Africa Company (UAC).

In March 1922, Leonard Hussey accompanied the body of Ernest Shackleton from Montevideo, Uruguay, to South Georgia for burial at Grytviken, aboard Woodville.

Whilst under her latest name of SS Volgas and with a Greek flag, she ran aground on the small Greek island of Milos in the Aegean Sea on 11 January 1937. She came ashore near the lighthouse on Paximadia, southwest of Milos, during a voyage from Mersin, Turkey, to Hamburg, Germany,  with a cargo of grain. Salvage was abandoned on 16 January and she was declared a total loss.

References

Sources 

 
 
 

1892 ships
Ships built on the River Tyne
Maritime incidents in 1937
Shipwrecks in the Aegean Sea
Shipwrecks of Greece